Wasdow is a village and a former municipality  in the district of Rostock, in Mecklenburg-Vorpommern, Germany. Since 5 September 2005, it is part of the municipality Behren-Lübchin.

Villages in Mecklenburg-Western Pomerania